Adrian Magee (born November 13, 1996) is an American football offensive guard who is a free agent. He played college football at LSU.

Early years
Magee attended Franklinton High School in Franklinton, Louisiana, joining the team the year after they won a Class 4A state title. He was an all-state selection at Franklinton High. Magee was considered a four-star recruit when he signed with LSU. His cousin was running back Terrence Magee.

College career
Magee redshirted his freshman season in 2015 after a foot injury in practice. When Magee arrived at LSU, he acquired the reputation as a jokester who sometimes fell asleep in practice. Since he rarely played, he impersonated opponents on the scout team. He played in three games as redshirt freshman in 2016. On April 25, 2017, Magee was arrested for burglary after he stole an Xbox, video games, flip flops, a speaker, and cash, and he was indefinitely suspended. He confessed to the burglary, returned some items, and the charges were dropped. After being reinstated to the football team, Magee earned his first start as a sophomore against Auburn and became a part of the rotation. He earned the nickname "Jiggly Puff".

As a junior, Magee started the first game against Miami (Fla.) In the first quarter of the game, he injured his knee and missed a month of playing time. He finished the season starting four games in three different positions, playing one game each at left and right tackle and two starts at left guard after Garrett Brumfield was hurt. Despite preferring to play offensive tackle, Magee learned more about sliding inside and handling defensive lineman, citing it as important in his development. By the start of preseason practice in 2019, Magee competed with Chasen Hines for the starting role at left guard, splitting time in the first game and Magee starting every game since. In the matchup against Vanderbilt, Magee made a double pancake block that went viral. Magee was named to the Second-team All-SEC as a senior. In the Peach Bowl win over Oklahoma, Magee switched to right guard after Damien Lewis was injured.

Professional career
Magee was signed by the New Orleans Saints as an undrafted free agent following the 2020 NFL Draft on April 29, 2020. He was waived on August 2, 2020.

References

External links
LSU bio

1996 births
Living people
Players of American football from Louisiana
People from Franklinton, Louisiana
American football offensive guards
LSU Tigers football players
New Orleans Saints players